NK Pomorac 1921 is a Croatian football club based in Kostrena, a suburb of Rijeka which currently plays in Croatian third tier 3. HNL West. Kostrena is known for its maritime tradition, which is reflected in the club's name, as the word "pomorac" means "mariner" or "seaman" in English.

History
Since the independence of Croatia in 1992 NK Pomorac played in Croatian Third Football League until the 1995–96 season, when they were promoted to the Druga HNL. NK Pomorac played in Druga HNL from 1996–97 to 2000–01, when they were promoted to the Prva HNL, Croatian top tier. The club had two seasons in Prva HNL – 2001–02 and 2002–03. Arguably, the 2001–02 season was the most successful in the club's history, as they finished 7th in the league and managed to reach the semifinal of the Croatian Cup. Since 2003, NK Pomorac have played in Druga HNL, where they regularly performed well and finished among the top teams. Pomorac had finished the 2009–10 and the 2011–12 seasons as runners-up, but were denied promotion as they were unable to gain a licence required to compete in top level.

In October 2014, due to financial troubles and increasing debt, NK Pomorac was dissolved after 93 years of existence. In November 2014, the club was re-established as NK Pomorac 1921. In August 2017, the club started competing in the Second League of Primorje-Gorski Kotar County, sixth tier in the Croatian football league system.

Honours
Druga HNL
Runners-up (5): 1996–97 (West), 2000–01, 2003–04 (South), 2009–10, 2011–12

Treća HNL – West:
Winners (2): 1995–96, 1998–99

Inter-county League Rijeka:
Winners (1): 2020–21

1. ŽNL Primorsko-goranska:
Winners (1): 2019–20

2. ŽNL Primorsko-goranska:
Winners (1): 2017–18

Recent seasons

Key

Top scorer shown in bold when he was also top scorer for the division.

P = Played
W = Games won
D = Games drawn
L = Games lost
F = Goals for
A = Goals against
Pts = Points
Pos = Final position

1. HNL = Prva HNL
2. HNL = Druga HNL
3. HNL = Treća HNL
4. NL Rijeka = Četvrta NL Rijeka
1. ŽNL = Prva ŽNL PGŽ
2. ŽNL = Druga ŽNL PGŽ

PR = Preliminary round
R1 = Round 1
R2 = Round 2
QF = Quarter-finals
SF = Semi-finals
RU = Runners-up
W  = Winners

References

Association football clubs established in 1921
Association football clubs established in 2014
Football clubs in Croatia
Football clubs in Primorje-Gorski Kotar County
1921 establishments in Croatia
2014 establishments in Croatia
Association football clubs disestablished in 2014
2014 disestablishments in Croatia